European Multidisciplinary Seafloor and water-column Observatory (EMSO) is a large-scale European distributed Research Infrastructure  for ocean observation, enabling real-time interactive long term monitoring of ocean processes. EMSO allows study of the interaction between the geosphere, the biosphere, the hydrosphere, and the lithosphere; including natural hazards, climate change, and marine ecosystems. EMSO nodes have been deployed at key sites in European seas, starting from the Arctic, through the Atlantic and Mediterranean, to the Black Sea.

Overview
EMSO is a consortium of partners sharing a common strategic framework of scientific facilities (data, instruments, computing and storage capacity). EMSO is a European Research Infrastructure Consortium (ERIC), a specific legal form created for pan-European large-scale research infrastructures by the European Commission that facilitates the establishment and operation of Research Infrastructures with European interest..
EMSO is one of the environmental RIs  on the Roadmap of the European Strategy Forum on Research Infrastructures (ESFRI). The ESRFI Roadmap identifies RIs of pan-European importance that corresponds to the long term needs of European research communities.

The different EMSO nodes are designed to address topics of regional importance: the biodiversity of mid ocean hot vents in the Azores region, the rapidly changing environmental conditions affecting the geosphere and biosphere of the Arctic, the deep-water ventilation in the eastern Mediterranean, the active seismicity and the associated geo-hazards of the Anatolian region.
EMSO infrastructure has the capacity to observe the deep and open ocean, below, at and above the seafloor, at the European scale, utilizing both stand-alone observing systems, and nodes connected to shore stations through high throughput fibre optic cable.
The mission of EMSO is to unite these regional observatories into a common research infrastructure, to implement more generic sensor packages to collect synoptic data series on oceanographic features of more than regional interest, to bring these data together in a uniform format accessible to the general public, and to ensure maintenance of this research infrastructure over a longer time-span than easily maintained by national funding programs.

Ocean observatories
The global oceans cover 70% of the surface of the globe, consist of 95% of the living space, and are the core momentum of our planet’s physical, chemical, and biological cycles. As underlined in recent policy documents such as the Galway Statement  and Belmont Challenge, in order to understand the changes predicted in the coming decades, EMSO aims to have a continuous presence in the oceans; and in order to understand both the slow moving and rapid catastrophes, EMSO seeks to have continuous real-time data from which to learn and to derive adaptation and early warning systems. Ocean observatories provide power and communications to allow a sustained interactive presence in the ocean. This challenge can only be addressed as part of an international cooperation between USA, Canada, Japan, Australia, Europe and other interested countries where EMSO takes a role for the European side.

Major science themes
The deployment of the EMSO distributed observatory nodes is allowing researchers to get useful data in order to understand the behaviour of the oceans and their impact on human society. 
In particular, EMSO collects data concerning the following main scientific fields:
 Geosciences: gas hydrate stability, seabed fluid flows, sub-marine landslides, geo-hazard early warning, mid-ocean ridge volcanism.
 Physical Oceanography: ocean warming, deep-ocean circulation, benthic and water-column interactions.
 Biogeochemistry: ocean acidification and the solubility pump, the biological pump, hypoxia, continental shelf exchange, deep-ocean biogeochemical fluxes.
 Marine Ecology: climate forcing of ecosystems, molecules to microbes, fisheries, marine noise, deep biosphere, chemosynthetic ecology.

EMSO ERIC
The Preparatory Phase of EMSO was funded by the European Seventh Framework Programme (FP7), involving 12 countries of the European area (Italy, France, Germany, Ireland, Spain, Sweden, Greece, UK, Norway, Portugal, Turkey, the Netherlands), and Romania (through GeoEcoMar), that has been involved as external interested country from 2010. The Preparatory Phase prepared the foundation for the adoption of the ERIC (European Research Infrastructure Consortium), that is the legal entity in charge of coordinating and facilitating access to these nodes of open ocean fixed point observatory distributed infrastructure.

EMSO ERIC is the central point of contact for observatory initiatives in other parts of the world to set up and promote cooperation in this field. EMSO ERIC integrates research, training, and information dissemination activities for ocean observatory nodes in Europe and enables scientists and other stakeholders to make efficient use of the EMSO distributed infrastructure around Europe.

EMSO Partners
 INGV
 Ifremer 
 CNRS
 KDM
 IMI
 UTM-CSIC 
 UGOT
 HCMR
 NOCS
 UIT
 FFCUL
 ITU-EMCOL
 NIOZ
 GEOECOMAR

List of projects

References

External links
 EMSO Website
 What are Research Infrastructures? - European Commission
 Coopeus

Oceanography
Physical oceanography
Cyberinfrastructure